Chris McKelvie (born February 22, 1985) is an American former professional ice hockey player. He last played with the Albany Devils of the American Hockey League (AHL).

Playing career
McKelvie played hockey at Irondale High School in New Brighton, Minnesota and then spent three seasons with the Bozeman IceDogs in the NAHL. In 2006, he began his education at Bemidji State University, playing four seasons of college hockey with the NCAA Division I Bemidji State Beavers men's ice hockey team, where he served as the team captain in his senior year.

On April 1, 2010, McKelvie was signed to his first professional contract by the Hartford Wolf Pack, and he played six games with the American Hockey League team towards the end of their 2009–10 season.

In September 2012, McKelvie was signed by the Albany Devils to an AHL contract. After serving as an alternate captain in his last three seasons with the Devils, McKelvie announced his retirement from professional hockey at the conclusion of the 2015–16 season, in order to pursue a coaching position as an assistant with the Army NCAA Team.

Career statistics

References

External links

1985 births
Albany Devils players
American men's ice hockey forwards
Bemidji State Beavers men's ice hockey players
Connecticut Whale (AHL) players
Greenville Road Warriors players
Hartford Wolf Pack players
Living people
People from New Brighton, Minnesota
Trenton Titans players